Piper aduncum, the spiked pepper, matico, hierba del soldado, achotlín, cordoncillo, higuillo or higuillo de hoja menuda, is a flowering plant in the family Piperaceae. Like many species in the family, the matico tree has a peppery odor.

Culinary use
Like many species of the family, this tree has the characteristic smell of pepper. The fruits are used as a condiment and for flavoring cocoa. It is sometimes used as a substitute for long pepper.

Traditional medicine
In the Amazon Rainforest, many of the native tribes use matico leaves as an antiseptic. In Peru, it was used for stopping hemorrhages and treating ulcers, and in European practice in the treatment of diseases of the genitals and urinary organs, such as those for which cubeb was often prescribed.

Essential oil
The chemical composition of the essential oil differs depending on the origin, although phenylpropanoid dillapiole is the most cited component, followed by myristicin, 1,8-cineole and β-ocimene. The essential oil of P. aduncum was considered a promising insecticide, acaricide and antiparasitic in a 2021 review.

Description
Matico is a tropical, evergreen, shrubby tree that grows to the height of 6 to 7 meters (20 to 23 ft) with lance-shaped leaves that are 12 to 20 centimeters (5 to 8 in) long. Its fruit is a small drupe with black seeds. It is native to Southern Mexico, the Caribbean, and much of tropical South America. It is grown in tropical Asia, Polynesia, and Melanesia and can even be found in Florida, Hawaii, and Puerto Rico. In some countries matico is considered as an invasive weed. In parts of New Guinea, although matico is notorious for drying out the soil in the areas where it is invasive, the wood of this plant is nonetheless used by local residents for a myriad of uses such as for fuel and fence posts.

Etymology
According to legends, the plant was discovered for Europeans, not for humanity, by a wounded Spanish soldier named Matico. The natives had been using it before the arrival of Europeans, as such it is not correct to say that Matico discovered it, without the qualification. He learned, presumably from the local tribes, that applying the leaves to his wounds stopped bleeding, and it began to be called "Matico" or "soldier's herb". It was introduced into the profession of medicine in the United States and Europe by a Liverpool physician in 1839 as a styptic and astringent for wounds.

Taxonomy 
Piper aduncum was described by Linnaeus and published in Species Plantarum 1: 29. 1753.

Accepted varieties
 Piper aduncum var. cordulatum (C. DC.) Yunck.
 Piper aduncum var. ossanum (C. DC.) Saralegui

Synonyms
 Artanthe adunca (L.) Miq.
 Artanthe cearensis Miq.
 Artanthe celtidifolia (Kunth) Miq.
 Artanthe elongata (Vahl) Miq.
 Artanthe galeottii Miq.
 Artanthe galleoti Miq.
 Artanthe granulosa Miq.
 Artanthe vellozoana Miq.
 Lepianthes granulatum Raf.
 Piper acutifolium var. membranaceum C. DC.
 Piper aduncifolium Trel.
 Piper anguillaespicum Trel.
 Piper angustifolium Ruiz & Pav.
 Piper cardenasii Trel.
 Piper celtidifolium Kunth
 Piper disparispicum Trel.
 Piper elongatifolium Trel.
 Piper elongatum Vahl
 Piper fatoanum C. DC.
 Piper flavescens (C. DC.) Trel.
 Piper guanaianum C. DC.
 Piper herzogii C. DC.
 Piper intersitum f. porcecitense Trel.
 Piper kuntzei C. DC.
 Piper lineatum var. hirtipetiolatum Trel.
 Piper multinervium M.Martens & Galeotti
 Piper nonconformans Trel.
 Piper oblanceolatum var. fragilicaule Trel.
 Piper pseudovelutinum var. flavescens C. DC.
 Piper purpurascens D. Dietr.
 Piper reciprocum Trel.
 Piper submolle Trel.
 Steffensia adunca (L.) Kunth
 Steffensia angustifolia Kunth
 Steffensia celtidifolia (Kunth) Kunth
 Steffensia elongata (Vahl) Kunth

References

External links

Piper aduncum by Alfred Hartemink
Friday Fellow: "Spiked Pepper" at Earthling Nature.

aduncum
Flora of Mexico
Flora of Belize
Flora of Costa Rica
Flora of El Salvador
Flora of Guatemala
Trees of Guatemala
Flora of Honduras
Flora of Nicaragua
Flora of Panama
Flora of Barbados
Flora of Cuba
Flora of Dominica
Flora of Jamaica
Flora of Martinique
Flora of Puerto Rico
Flora of Guyana
Flora of Suriname
Flora of Venezuela
Flora of Brazil
Flora of Bolivia
Flora of Colombia
Flora of Ecuador
Flora of Peru
Medicinal plants of North America
Medicinal plants of South America
Tropical agriculture
Plants described in 1753
Taxa named by Carl Linnaeus
Flora without expected TNC conservation status